Šutovo is a village in the municipality of Kičevo, North Macedonia. It used to be part of the former municipality of Oslomej.

Demographics
As of the 2021 census, Šutovo had 397 residents with the following ethnic composition:
Albanians 376
Persons for whom data are taken from administrative sources 21

According to the 2002 census, the village had a total of 760 inhabitants. Ethnic groups in the village include:
Albanians 737
Macedonians 12
Others 11

References

External links

Villages in Kičevo Municipality
Albanian communities in North Macedonia